Veigné is a commune in the Indre-et-Loire department in central France.

Geography
Veigné is located next to the river Indre, 12 kilometres south of Tours.

Population

See also
Communes of the Indre-et-Loire department

References

Communes of Indre-et-Loire